Geto Onsen is a traditional ryokan (Japanese inn) with "onsen" - natural hot spring baths. It was founded in 1134 and is located in Kitakami, Iwate Prefecture, Japan.

The area is in the center of Kurikoma Quasi-National Park and the hotel is located near the narrow and shallow river with a crystal clear water.
There are 5 baths with a fine hot water and also colder water coming from underground springs.

Hotel rooms are simple, but comfortable with traditional tatami and can be rented for a few hours to rest after the bathing. Some tourists come not only for springs, but to spend more days and enjoy one of Japan's most beautiful nature spots.

See also
Onsen
List of oldest companies

References

External links
Homepage in Japanese
Hotel on Google Maps

Hotels in Japan
12th-century establishments in Japan
Hot springs of Iwate Prefecture
Kitakami, Iwate